The Mosque of Almalik al-Jukandar is located near the Mashad of Husayn and Al-Azhar Mosque in the historic area of Cairo. Founded during the Bahri Mamluk period during the third reign of Al-Nasir Muhammad, it is less documented by modern researchers and historians.

Founder

Almalik al-Jukandar was a powerful and wealth Mamluk amir during the third reign of Al-Nasir Muhammad, and later Qalawunid sultans. He would die while imprisoned in Alexandria in 747 A.H. (1346 C.E.) during the reign of al-Kamil Sha'ban.

The Institution
According to al-Maqrizi, Almalik al-Jukandar founded it in 758 A.H. (1357 C.E.) as a madrasa that taught the Shafiʽi school of law. It was provided for by several endowments (awqaf). The complex also included a library.

Inscription

On the main entrance of the building there is an inscription, although in poor condition, that flanks both sides of the portal. It reads:

As the inscription makes clear, the founder of the institution is Almalik al-Jukandar during the third reign of al-Nasir (Muhammad).

See also

 List of Historic Monuments in Cairo

References

Mamluk architecture in Egypt
14th-century mosques
Mosques in Cairo
Historical Monuments in Cairo